John Otto "Buck" Young (April 12, 1920 – February 9, 2000) was an American actor who played the role as Sergeant Whipple on the Gomer Pyle, U.S.M.C. TV series, and Deputy Joe Watson on The Andy Griffith Show.

In 1944, during World War II, Young was drafted into the US Army Air Forces. He married actress Peggy Stewart in 1953 and had two children, Grey Young and Abigail Young who each acted in one film.  He was the brother-in-law of Stewart's sister, Patricia O'Rourke, and her husband, Wayne Morris.

In 1962, he appeared in James Arness’s TV Western series Gunsmoke, playing “Corporal Stone” in S7E27’s “”Wagon Girls”.

Buck Young took the part as Sgt Whipple in the Gomer Pyle, U.S.M.C. TV series at the beginning of the show in 1964. He acted in a total of 95 films and the Gomer Pyle. U.S.M.C. series. Buck Young also played in Barnaby Jones in the episode titled “The Last Contract” (12/31/1974).

Young died on February 9, 2000, in Los Angeles at age 79.

Filmography
Angel Face (1953) – Assistant District Attorney (uncredited)
The Girls of Pleasure Island (1953) – Marine (uncredited)
Affair with a Stranger (1953) – Minor Role (uncredited)
The French Line (1953) – Photographer On Dock (uncredited)
Money from Home (1953) – (uncredited)
3 Ring Circus (1954) – Soldier (uncredited)
Loving You (1957) – Assistant Director (uncredited)
Jet Pilot (1957) – Sergeant (uncredited)
Official Detective TV series – episode "The Wristwatch" - Marty Lacker (1958) 
Night of the Quarter Moon (1959) – Reporter (uncredited)
Not with My Wife, You Don't! (1966) – Air Police Colonel
The Young Warriors (1966) – Schumacher
The Bamboo Saucer (1968) – Pete (uncredited)
Suppose They Gave a War and Nobody Came (1970) – Deputy Ron
The Late Liz (1971) – Logan Pearson
"The Men From Shiloh (rebranded name of The Virginian) TV series – episode "The Town Killer"  - Carter Reed (1971) 
Pickup on 101 (1972) – Car Family of Four #1
Breezy (1973) – Paula's Escort
Lepke (1975) – Second Reporter
Mitchell (1975) – Detective Aldridge
White House Madness (1975) – Admiral
Two-Minute Warning (1976) – Baltimore Booster #1
Claws (1977) – Pilot
The Magic of Lassie (1978) – T.V. Announcer
The Lady in Red (1979) – Hennessey
Death Wish II (1982) – Charles Pearce
Sam's Son (1984) – Marv Gates
Last Resort (1986) – Mr. Emerson

References

External links

1920 births
2000 deaths
American male television actors
American male film actors
United States Army Air Forces personnel of World War II
20th-century American male actors